De La Salle College Ballyshannon is a secondary school in County Donegal, Ireland.

Its catchment area extends into County Leitrim.

History
It won the All-Ireland Colleges Title in 1980 with only 155 pupils at the time, beating St Mary's CBS of Portlaoise at Croke Park. It won the McLarnon Cup in 1999.

Notable alumni

 Matt Gallagher: Footballer
 Pauric McShea: Footballer
 Brian Murray: Footballer
 Brian Roper: Footballer
 Gary Walsh: Footballer

References

External links
 Website

Ballyshannon
Boys' schools in the Republic of Ireland
Catholic secondary schools in the Republic of Ireland
Ballyshannon
Secondary schools in County Donegal